Laokhowa Wildlife Sanctuary is protected area located in the state of Assam in India. This wildlife sanctuary covers 70.13 km2, on the south bank of the Brahmaputra River in Nagaon district, It is situated 40 km downstream of the Kaziranga National Park and 30 km northwest of the Orang National Park on the other side of the river Brahmaputra.

It is a part of the Laokhowa-Burachapori eco-system. The sanctuary is an ideal habitat for Indian rhinoceros and Asiatic water buffaloes. Other animals found here are the royal Bengal tiger, Indian leopard, Indian boar, civet, leopard cat, hog deer, etc. Over 200 species of birds have been recorded in the sanctuary, including migratory birds.

Laokhowa had more than 70 Indian rhinos in early 1980s which were all killed by poachers. In 2016, two rhinos, a mother and her daughter, were reintroduced to the sanctuary from Kaziranga National Park as part of the Indian Rhino Vision 2020 (IRV 2020) program, but both animals died within months due to natural causes.

It is open for tourists from the beginning of November to the end of April.

References

Brahmaputra Valley semi-evergreen forests
Wildlife sanctuaries in Assam
Nagaon district
Protected areas established in 1972
1972 establishments in Assam